The 2016–17 season was the 92nd season in Rayo Vallecano ’s history and first back in the Segunda División after relegation the previous year.

Squad

Competitions

Overall

Liga

League table

Matches

Kickoff times are in CET.

Copa del Rey

References

Rayo Vallecano seasons
Rayo Vallecano